Vilmos Patay (born 1953) is a Hungarian agrarian trader and politician, member of the National Assembly (MP) for Dombóvár (Tolna County Constituency IV) between 2010 and 2014. He also served as mayor of Dombóvár between 2009 and 2010.

Patay was elected mayor during a by-election on 11 October 2009, after the previous mayor Loránd Szabó (MSZP) resigned from his position due corruption scandal. However Patay lost his office, when Szabó was re-elected mayor in the 2010 local elections. Patay was a member of the Parliamentary Committee on Agriculture from 14 May 2010 to 5 May 2014. He was appointed a member of the Committee on Employment and Labour on 11 February 2013.

References

Living people
Mayors of places in Hungary
Fidesz politicians
Members of the National Assembly of Hungary (2010–2014)
1953 births